Granville Van Dusen (born March 16, 1944 in Grand Rapids, Minnesota) is an American stage, screen, and voice actor who portrayed Race Bannon in the 1986 television series The New Adventures of Jonny Quest, Jonny's Golden Quest, Jonny Quest vs. The Cyber Insects, and two episodes of The Real Adventures of Jonny Quest.

Other acting credits
Van Dusen appeared on CBS daytime soap opera The Young and the Restless and ABC's Port Charles.  He was also the second actor to portray attorney Walter Telford on the Canadian-based soap opera, High Hopes.  He also has appeared in the sitcom Soap as a doctor taking care of, and ultimately falling for, Jessica Tate (portrayed by actress Katherine Helmond). He also appeared in many TV series such as Kojak; The Bionic Woman; CHiPs; Three's Company; Matlock; Diagnosis: Murder; Walker, Texas Ranger; Barnaby Jones; Dr. Quinn, Medicine Woman;  Rhoda; The Eddie Capra Mysteries; Magnum, P.I.; Lois & Clark: The New Adventures Of Superman; and The West Wing.

Filmography

Film

Television

Video games

References

External links

Actor Granville Van Dusen biography at Film Reference.com

1944 births
Living people
American people of Dutch descent
People from Grand Rapids, Minnesota
American male television actors
American male voice actors
American male stage actors